Steven Bernard Wilks (born August 8, 1969) is an American football coach and former player who is the defensive coordinator for the San Francisco 49ers of the National Football League (NFL). He was the head coach for the Arizona Cardinals in 2018. He has also been the defensive backs coach for the Chicago Bears and San Diego Chargers, and the defensive coordinator for the Carolina Panthers and Cleveland Browns and Missouri.

Wilks is a two-time NFC Champion, winning with the Bears in 2006 and with the Panthers in 2015, losing the Super Bowl on both occasions.

Playing career
Wilks played defensive back from 1987 to 1991 at Appalachian State.

Wilks played one year (1993) in the Arena Football League for the Charlotte Rage as a wide receiver, defensive back, and kick returner.

Coaching career

College
Wilks served as head football coach at Savannah State College for one season (1999) and compiled a record of 5–6.

Chicago Bears
Wilks was hired by the Chicago Bears as defensive backs coach on February 16, 2006.  The Bears announced on December 30, 2008, that they had fired Wilks.

San Diego Chargers
Wilks was hired as defensive backs coach of the San Diego Chargers in 2009 when former Bears defensive coordinator Ron Rivera moved to the same position in San Diego.

Carolina Panthers 
When Rivera became head coach of the Panthers, he hired Wilks as secondary coach on January 15, 2012.  He was promoted to assistant head coach in 2015. He was Pro Football Focus's second runner up to their Secondary Coach of the Year award.

In the 2015 season, Wilks and the Panthers finished 15–1 and reached Super Bowl 50 on February 7, 2016. The Panthers fell to the Denver Broncos by a score of 24–10.

After defensive coordinator Sean McDermott left to become head coach of the Buffalo Bills, Wilks was promoted to McDermott's former position.

After the 2017 season, Wilks was an extremely hot commodity for teams in need of new head coaches. According to Ian Rapoport of the NFL Network, teams were impressed by Wilks's interview with the Los Angeles Rams in the previous offseason before they eventually hired Sean McVay. Wilks interviewed with the New York Giants who had hired his former boss in Carolina, ex-Panthers general manager David Gettleman.

Arizona Cardinals
On January 22, 2018, Wilks was hired as head coach of the Arizona Cardinals, replacing Bruce Arians, who initially retired after the 2017 season before coming out of retirement in early 2019 to become the head coach of the Tampa Bay Buccaneers. In the 2018 season opener against the Washington Redskins, Wilks made his head coaching debut in the 24–6 loss. In Week 5, against the San Francisco 49ers, he recorded his first NFL victory as a head coach. He finished coaching the season with an NFL-worst 3–13 record and the worst record for the Cardinals since 2000. On December 31, 2018, the Cardinals fired Wilks.

Cleveland Browns
On January 14, 2019, Wilks was hired by the Cleveland Browns to be their defensive coordinator under head coach Freddie Kitchens. He was not retained under new head coach Kevin Stefanski.

Missouri
On January 21, 2021, Wilks was hired by the University of Missouri as their defensive coordinator under head coach Eliah Drinkwitz.

Carolina Panthers (second stint)
On February 9, 2022, the Panthers announced the hiring of Wilks as Matt Rhule's new defensive pass game coordinator and secondary coach. On October 10, 2022 after Rhule was fired, Wilks was named the Panthers' interim head coach for the remainder of the season.

San Francisco 49ers
On February 9, 2023, it was reported that the 49ers hired Steve Wilks as their defensive coordinator. Then during the 2023 NFL Combine, 49ers general manager John Lynch confirmed that Wilks was hired as their defensive coordinator.

Head coaching record

College

NFL

* – Interim head coach

Personal life
Wilks is a Christian. He is married to Marcia Wilks. They have two daughters and one son.

References

1969 births
Living people
American football defensive backs
American football wide receivers
Appalachian State Mountaineers football coaches
Appalachian State Mountaineers football players
Arizona Cardinals head coaches
Bowling Green Falcons football coaches
Carolina Panthers coaches
Carolina Panthers head coaches
Charlotte Rage players
Chicago Bears coaches
Cleveland Browns coaches
East Tennessee State Buccaneers football coaches
Illinois State Redbirds football coaches
Johnson C. Smith Golden Bulls football coaches
Missouri Tigers football coaches
National Football League defensive coordinators
Notre Dame Fighting Irish football coaches
San Diego Chargers coaches
San Francisco 49ers coaches
Savannah State Tigers football coaches
Washington Huskies football coaches
Sportspeople from Charlotte, North Carolina
Players of American football from Charlotte, North Carolina
African-American coaches of American football
African-American players of American football
21st-century African-American people
20th-century African-American sportspeople